Ahsan I. Butt is a Pakistani political scientist. He is an associate professor at the Schar School of Policy and Government at George Mason University. He has published research on ethnicity and nationalism, security, international order, and South Asia. He is a frequent commentator on Pakistani politics.

Career
His book, Secession and Security: Explaining State Strategy Against Separatists, was named 2019 book of the year by the International Securities Studies Section at the International Studies Association. The book has been reviewed by multiple publications.

He has a PhD in Political Science from the University of Chicago.

Bibliography
 Secession and Security: Explaining State Strategy against Separatists (2017)

References 

Living people
Pakistani political scientists
Pakistani emigrants to the United States
International relations scholars
Year of birth missing (living people)
University of Chicago alumni
George Mason University faculty